Norman Charles Roettger Jr. (November 3, 1930 – July 26, 2003) was an American officer, lawyer and judge.

Born in Lucasville, Ohio, Roettger received a Bachelor of Arts degree from Ohio State University in 1952. He received a Bachelor of Laws from Washington and Lee University School of Law in 1958. He was in the United States Navy as a Lieutenant (j.g.) from 1952 to 1955, subsequently serving in the United States Naval Reserve as a Captain. 

He was in private practice of law in Cincinnati, Ohio from 1958 to 1959. He was in private practice of law in Fort Lauderdale, Florida from 1959 to 1969. He was acting general counsel and deputy general counsel for the United States Department of Housing and Urban Development from 1969 to 1971. He was in private practice of law in Fort Lauderdale from 1971 to 1972.

Roettger was nominated by President Richard Nixon on April 13, 1972, to a seat on the United States District Court for the Southern District of Florida vacated by Judge Ted Cabot. He was confirmed by the United States Senate on May 31, 1972, and received his commission on June 2, 1972. During this time, he initially ruled in favor of former Treblinka extermination camp guard Feodor Fedorenko. He served as Chief Judge from 1991 to 1997. He assumed senior status on June 17, 1997. His service was terminated on July 26, 2003, due to his death in Fort Lauderdale.

References

1930 births
2003 deaths
Ohio State University alumni
Judges of the United States District Court for the Southern District of Florida
United States district court judges appointed by Richard Nixon
20th-century American judges
People from Lucasville, Ohio